Hypselodoris bollandi is a species of colourful sea slug or dorid nudibranch, a marine gastropod mollusk in the family Chromodorididae.

Distribution
This nudibranch is found in the Western Pacific Ocean from the Philippines to Okinawa.

Description
Hypselodoris bollandi has a white body which is covered all over in tiny yellow dots. Its mantle edge is black-blue and dark spots are sometimes present on its dorsum. The gills and rhinophores are white, outlined with red. There is some colour variation in this species

This nudibranch can reach a total length of at least 30 mm.

References

Further reading

 Debelius, H. & Kuiter, R.H. (2007) Nudibranchs of the world. ConchBooks, Frankfurt, 360 pp. 
 Gosliner, T.M., Behrens, D.W. & Valdés, Á. (2008) Indo-Pacific Nudibranchs and seaslugs. A field guide to the world's most diverse fauna. Sea Challengers Natural History Books, Washington, 426 pp. page(s): 260

External links 
 Hypselodoris bollandi page at nudipixel

Chromodorididae
Gastropods described in 1999